O'Gorman High School may refer to:

 O'Gorman High School (Timmins)
 O'Gorman Catholic High School (Sioux Falls, South Dakota)

See also
O'Gorman, a surname